Zoom is an Indian glamour and entertainment television channel primarily covering Bollywood and based in Mumbai. The channel was launched in September 2004 and caters primarily to urban audiences. It started out as a music/Bollywood/serial channel, but quickly pulled serials off the air, becoming a music and Bollywood news channel within months. It is a part of The Times Group, one of India's largest media conglomerates. An internet pioneer, it has been available on mobile internet since March 2009. Zoom is available across 60 countries worldwide along with a digital presence.

Shows broadcast by Zoom
Cutting Pyaar
Mirchi top 20 Planet BollywoodTelly Top UpRequest Kiya HaiMusic TakatakMann Ki DhunThank God It's FrydayLikes Bajao30 Mein 30Times CelebexTop 50 TrendingStar Of The MonthKosmiic ChatKya KaheinGehraiyaanZumba Dance Fitness PartyToofani Hitsfashion superstarby invite only ''
 The Next 100

References

External links
 

Television stations in Mumbai
Television channels and stations established in 2004
Television channels of The Times Group
Indian music mass media
2004 establishments in Maharashtra
Music television channels in India